Janela may refer to:
Janela, Cape Verde, a village in Santo Antão, Cape Verde
Ribeira da Janela, a parish in the district of Porto Moniz in Madeira 
Ribeira da Janela, Cape Verde, a river in Santo Antão, Cape Verde